Igor Matanović (born 31 March 2003) is a German-Croatian professional footballer who plays as a forward for 2. Bundesliga club FC St. Pauli, on loan from Eintracht Frankfurt.

Club career
Matanović played for the youth team of Harburger TB until 2010, when he moved to FC St. Pauli's youth academy. He made his professional debut for St. Pauli's senior team in the 2. Bundesliga on 27 November 2020, coming on as a substitute in the 87th minute for Rico Benatelli against VfL Osnabrück. The home match finished as a 1–0 loss.

On 30 August 2021, he signed a five-year contract for Eintracht Frankfurt; on the same day he returned to FC St. Pauli on loan.

In April 2022, he declared his intention to represent Croatia internationally.

References

External links
 
 
 
 

2003 births
Living people
Footballers from Hamburg
German people of Croatian descent
Association football forwards
Croatian footballers
Croatia youth international footballers
German footballers
Germany youth international footballers
FC St. Pauli players
Eintracht Frankfurt players
2. Bundesliga players
Regionalliga players